Gyula Csaba Dudás (born 20 August 1966 in Hungary, Tököl Budapest ) is a male race walker from Hungary.

Achievements

References
 

1966 births
Living people
Slovak male racewalkers
Hungarian male racewalkers
Athletes (track and field) at the 2000 Summer Olympics
Athletes (track and field) at the 2004 Summer Olympics
Olympic athletes of Hungary
Hungarians in Slovakia
Sportspeople from Trebišov
People from Tököl
Sportspeople from Pest County
20th-century Hungarian people
21st-century Hungarian people